Events in the year 1578 in Norway.

Incumbents
Monarch: Frederick II

Events

Arts and literature

Births

Deaths
17 September – Hans Gaas, clergyman (born c. 1500).

See also

References